Mink Lake is the second-largest wilderness lake in the US state of Oregon.

Hiking trails enter the Mink Lake Basin, at the headwaters of the South Fork McKenzie River, from many directions. Natural campsites abound in the area, but in warm weather mosquitoes can be a problem.

So few chemicals and nutrients enter this lake that it is classified as ultraoligotrophic, and it is thought to be among the most pristine lakes in Oregon. Fishing is possible here mainly because of stocking.

See also
 List of lakes of Oregon

Notes and references
Notes

References

Lakes of Oregon
Lakes of Lane County, Oregon
Protected areas of Lane County, Oregon
Willamette National Forest